Fight was a heavy metal band formed in Phoenix, Arizona by British vocalist Rob Halford following his departure from Judas Priest in 1992.

Biography
Halford began writing material in 1991 after drawing inspiration by Pantera's sound during their tour supporting Cowboys From Hell. The initial intention was for his solo project to be briefly short while remaining a member for Judas Priest, but their relationship worsened in 1992 and he was no longer in the band in September of that year. He then started his own band called Fight and recruited drummer Scott Travis, despite Travis still being Judas Priest's member. The line-up was completed by guitarists Russ Parrish and Brian Tilse and bassist John "Jay Jay" Brown. The debut album War of Words was released in 1993, which sold 200,000 copies and is a favourite among Judas Priest fans. An EP titled Mutations was released in 1994, containing live tracks and remixes. Parrish would no longer be in the band in 1994 and Robby Lochner filled-in for the live shows until new member Mark Chaussee joined the group. The second album A Small Deadly Space was released in 1995, but was not as successful as the previous album. As material for a third album were being prepared, Fight were dismissed from Epic Records, resulting in the band splitting up in the fall of 1995.

On December 20, 1997, the band reunited with three of the original members for a one-off performance at the Mason Jar in Phoenix.

Halford would not rule out the possibility of Fight's reformation.

Discography

Studio albums

Compilation albums

Video albums

References

External links

1992 establishments in Arizona
1995 disestablishments in Arizona
Heavy metal musical groups from Arizona
American groove metal musical groups
American thrash metal musical groups
Judas Priest
Musical groups established in 1992
Musical groups disestablished in 1995
Musical quintets